Pecan Bayou is a slow-moving stream in Callahan County, Texas. The stream is fed by over twenty creeks and is one of the major tributaries of the Colorado River in Texas. It may be the westernmost bayou in the United States. A dam on Pecan Bayou seven miles north of Brownwood forms Lake Brownwood.  Below Lake Brownwood, the stream flows through Brownwood and Early, Texas into western Mills county before the confluence with the Colorado River about 8 miles west of Goldthwaite, Texas.

See also
List of rivers of Texas

References

USGS Geographic Names Information Service
USGS Hydrologic Unit Map - State of Texas (1974)

Rivers of Texas
Bodies of water of Brown County, Texas
Tributaries of the Colorado River (Texas)